A number of the male footballers who have reached international status with Spain were not born in the country. Some were born overseas and moved there at a young age (as far as this list is concerned, more often they were the children of Spanish migrants who decided to return, rather than migrant newcomers from other parts of the world) while others became naturalised citizens of Spain after living there for the required period and never being selected by their homeland – for some countries, including those of Latin America, this process requires only a few years of residency, which has allowed several Brazil-born players to play for Spain having only moved there in the course of their professional careers. Prior to the 1960s, players were not tied to a single national team having appeared for them, and some of the leading foreign players in the Spanish league in the 1950s thus were selected on residency grounds.

This list does not include players born in non-peninsular Spain (the Canary Islands, Balearic Islands, Ceuta and Melilla, all of which have provided at least one player for the national team), nor any internationals of other heritage who were born in Spain.

List of players

List by country of birth

See also
List of Spain international footballers
Oriundo
Spanish nationality law

References

External links
 Spain national team players (with place of birth) at BDFutbol
Todos los jugadores (all the players) at Selección Española de Fútbol (official site)

Association football player non-biographical articles
Spain

Naturalised citizens of Spain 
Immigration to Spain
Spanish diaspora
Spain